Solange Wilvert (born September 1, 1989) is a Brazilian model.

Biography
Wilvert was born in Florianópolis, Santa Catarina, Brazil. She was discovered during a casting session at her public school in Florianópolis. She was only 14 years old at the time, but in only four weeks she had landed a contract in New York City.

Modelling career
She has appeared on the catwalk for high designers Chanel, Alexander McQueen, Marc Jacobs, Karl Lagerfeld, and more. She was the face of Chanel, Calvin Klein, Fendi, Gucci, Stella McCartney, and others. She was on the cover of Stiletto, Vogue (3 times), and Wonderland.

References

External links

 Askmen – Profile on AskMen

1988 births
Living people
People from Florianópolis
Brazilian people of German descent
Brazilian female models
Brazilian models of German descent